Kairali TV is an Indian Malayalam language general entertainment Free to air television channel. owned by Kairali TV Network. It is headquartered at Thiruvananthapuram. It was launched on 17 August 2000. The channel is backed by the Communist Party of India (Marxist) (CPI[M]).

History
The channel was launched in August 2000 by the then ruling party Communist Party of India (Marxist) (CPI[M]). Two Malayalam film actors were appointed in major positions—Mammootty as chairman and Mohanlal as director.

Sister channels

Current shows 
 Homely Family
 Kerala Lottery Live
 Celebrity Kitchen Magic
 Comedy Thillana

Former shows

Notable programming 

 Aswamedham
 Atlas Ganopahaaram
 Big Screen
 Flavours of India
 Priyapetta Mammootty
 Amchi Mumbai
 Rhythm
 Symphony
 Grab The Spot Light
 Laya Tharang
 Kerala Cafe
 Jollywood Junction
 Fresh Hits
 Loud Speaker
 Nakshathradeepangal
 Kadha Parayumbol
 E 4 Elephant
 Sreeraamante Veritta Kadhakal
 Madhyama Vicharam
 Vasthu
 Veettamma
 Student's Only
 Chamayam
 Hello Good Evening
 Pravasalokam
 Magic Oven
 Take One
 Shoot And Show
 Sing'nWin
 Manassiloru Mazhavillu
 Manimelam
 Madhuchandrika
 Dr. Talk
 Subhadinam
 Chirikkum Pattanam
 Surabhi
 Deepanjali
 Kanakazhchakal
 Star Ragging
 Dum Dum Pee Pee
 Colours Of Kuwait
 Coffee With Boss
 Raindrops
 Penmalayalam
 Action Khiladi
 Dewdrops
 Jagapoka

Serials

Dubbed series 
 Crime Patrol (2020)
 Vicharana (2017-2020)
 Vikramadithyanum Vethalavum (2015-2016)
 Pranaya Varnangal (2017-2018)
 CID (2020-2021)

Original series 
 Kunhamman – Comedy cartoon series completed 2000 episodes
 A Amma (2007-2008)
 Action Zero Shiju (2016)
 Akkara Kazhchakal (2008-2010)
 Akkare Akkare (2008)
 Anna - Telefilm (2000)
 Aro Oraal
 Aarohanam (2001)
 Avasthantharangal (2001)
 Ayyadi Maname
 Chila Kudumba Chitrangal (2002-2004)
 Chitashalabam
 Crime branch
 Daya (2006)
 Dosth (2012)
 December Mist - Telefilm (2000)
 Evide ellarkum sukham (2014-2015)
 Jagrata
 Kanakkinavu
 Kanamarayathu (2012)
 Karyam Nissaram – Longest running serial on Kairali TV (no. of episodes 1104) (2012-2017)
 Khalli Valli
 Krithyam (2019)
 Kochu Threseeya Kochu (2006)
 Kudumba Kodathi (2019)
 Kudumba Police (2016-2017)
 Lasagu
 Maaya (2000)
 Manasa Mynaa (2015-2016)
 Mandaram (2005-2006)
 Mandoos (2006)
 Mangalya Pattu
 Meghasandesham (2015-2016)
 Mizhineerpookkkal (2015-2016)
 Mounanombaram (2006-2007)
 Mukesh Kadhakal
 Nanmayude Nakshtrangal - telefilm
 Nellikka
 Nilapakshi (2012-2013)
 Onam Offer - telefilm
 Panchagni (2012-2013)
 Piravikku Mumpe - telefilm
 Priyam (2005-2006)
 Punchiri travels (2015-2016)
 Salamath Cafe (2015)
 Summer in America
 Sumangali (2002)
 Sundari Mukku (2016)
 Sulthan Veedu (2004)
 Swantham Mallootty
 Ulkadal (2013)
 Ullathu Paranjal (2018-2019)
 Umma Ariyatha Katha - telefilm
 Utopyan sarkar (2015)
 Velutha Kathreena (2006-2007)(The serial was retelecasted as  Kanalpoovu during the first lockdown in 2020)
 Vermi

Reality shows 

 Swaralaya Gandharva Sangeetham Season 1-10
 Patturummal Season 1-8
 Kadha Parayumbol
 Mampazham Season 1-10
 Kuttypatturummal
 Kitchen Magic Season 1-4
 Aarpoo Erro
 Tharolosavam Season 1-3
 Little Stars
 Mummy And Me
 Star Wars
 Amma Ammayiyamma Season 1-2
 Nakshatradeepangal (Tharolsavam Season 4)
 Manimellam
 Minnaminnge
 Aksharamuttam Season 1-4
 Kutty Chef

References 

Malayalam-language television channels
Television stations in Thiruvananthapuram
Television channels and stations established in 2000
2000 establishments in Kerala